Hellhammer was a Swiss heavy metal band from Nürensdorf, active from 1982 to 1984. Although the band's sound and style were heavily criticized and poorly reviewed during their active years, they have been widely praised in retrospect and are often regarded as a key influence on black metal. In June 1984, Hellhammer disbanded but two of its members soon formed the influential extreme metal band Celtic Frost.

History 

Inspired by the music of Black Sabbath, Venom, Raven, Motörhead and Angel Witch, guitarist/vocalist Thomas Gabriel Fischer (a.k.a. "Tom Warrior"), bassist/vocalist Urs Sprenger (a.k.a. "Savage Damage" and "Steve Warrior") and drummer Pete Stratton formed Hammerhead (later Hellhammer) in early 1982. Although Fischer "was not into punk at all," he was "blown away" by the Discharge recordsWhy and Hear Nothing See Nothing Say Nothing, which profoundly influenced his music from then on. As he noted, a lack of extreme metal at the time meant that fans of Venom and Motörhead often had to resort to punk bands for similar sounds. GBH and Anti-Nowhere League also proved influential.

After the exit of Stratton and drummer Jörg Neubart (aka "Denial Fiend" and "Bruce Day") joining in the ranks in autumn 1982, Hellhammer attempted to find proper rehearsal spaces, which proved difficult due to either exceedingly high rents or unavailable studio hours. In June 1983, the group recorded their demo tape, Triumph of Death, for a mere $70. Despite being embarrassed by the end results, Hellhammer shipped their demo to a number of heavy metal magazines, such as Great Britain's Metal Forces; critical response toward them was generally favorable. Although rejected by the labels they sent tapes to, the band eventually caught the attention of newcomer Noise Records.

Steve Warrior had been replaced by former Schizo bassist Martin Eric Ain, a change which marked the beginning of a serious and radical transformation in the band's music and lyrics. These changes were ultimately responsible for Fischer's and Ain's increasing perception of being limited within the confines of the purposely primitive Hellhammer vehicle. Hellhammer disbanded in May 1984, and Fischer and Ain formed a new band under the name of Celtic Frost in June.

At the dawn of the next decade Noise Records released a new version of Hellhammer's debut, retitled Apocalyptic Raids 1990 A.D. This re-issue was augmented by two tracks off the Death Metal compilation, which was "something we always wanted to, even back in '84", claimed Tom Warrior. This re-release also came with a new cover design done by Martin Ain.

In November 2007, Tom Gabriel Fischer announced that the original master tapes of Hellhammer's demos (Death Fiend, Triumph of Death, and Satanic Rites) would be released as a 2CD/3LP package, titled Demon Entrails, in February 2008 with new liner notes on the complete history of Hellhammer, unreleased photos and artwork, and all tracks remastered personally by Tom Gabriel Fischer, Martin Eric Ain and Steve Warrior. The album was released by Prowlin' Death/Century Media Records.

Additionally, Tom Fischer released a book in 2010 titled Only Death Is Real: An Illustrated History of Hellhammer and early Celtic Frost 1982–1985, which documents the early days of said bands. The book featured a foreword by Darkthrone guitarist Nocturno Culto and an introduction by the author Joel McIver.

In 2016, both Century Media and Prowling Death Records joint released an unreleased 7" vinyl single the band originally recorded in 1983 titled Blood Insanity. Tom Gabriel Fischer explained that the band contemplated releasing material they recorded at the time of the Triumph of Death demo sessions which would contain two songs. Unfortunately, the single languished into an unrealized state until the band's split, rendering any plans for future releases redundant. Fischer went on to say that it never left his mind since then and presented the idea of releasing the single to Century Media, in which the record company agreed.

Criticism 
Although its former members felt proud of Hellhammer's legacy by the end of the 1980s, that was not always so. In fact, Tom Warrior feared that his prior commitment to Hellhammer could hinder the future of Celtic Frost. A 1985 Kerrang! review summed up his worst fears: "The truly execrable Hellhammer may now have turned into Celtic Frost but still suck on the big one."

Other metal publications were also skeptical of Hellhammer's musical endeavor. Metal Forces, for one, absolutely loathed the group; that started a long-lasting feud between that zine and Warrior, which kept Celtic Frost from playing in England for a couple of years. Rock Power was not fond of Hellhammer either; they considered it "the most terrible, abhorrent, and atrocious thing 'musicians' were ever allowed to record". In fact, they were "receiving miserable reviews everywhere", Warrior concluded.

Regarding the controversial status of his former band, Thomas said:

Legacy 
A four-track 12" EP, Apocalyptic Raids, was released in March 1984. At the time, it was regarded as one of the heaviest and most extreme records produced. By then, the band had already broken up, but the recording was one of the original black/death metal recordings, and spawned a legion of imitators, playing doom metal, thrash metal, black metal and death metal. Both Fischer and Ain later teamed up again when forming Celtic Frost in summer of 1984.

Hellhammer covers by notable bands include Napalm Death, Sepultura, Samael, Incantation, Slaughter, Behemoth, and Gallhammer. Fischer's post-Celtic Frost band, Apollyon Sun, also re-worked "Messiah".

Band's members

Final 
 Tom G. "Satanic Slaughter" Warrior (Thomas Gabriel Fischer) – guitar, lead vocals (1982–1984)
 "Slayed Necros" (Martin Eric Ain) – bass (1983–1984; died 2017)
 Bruce "Denial Fiend" Day (Jörg Neubart) – drums (1982–1984)

Previous members 
 Pete Stratton (Peter Ebneter) – drums (1982)
 Steve "Savage Damage" Warrior (Urs Sprenger) – bass, vocals (1982–1983)
 Stephen "Evoked Damnator" Priestly (Stephen Gasser) – bass (1983)
 Mike "Grim Decapitator" Owens – bass (1983)
 Vince "Dei Infernal" Caretti (Oliver Amberg) – guitar (1984)

Timeline

Discography

Demos

Studio releases

Compilation albums

References

Sources 
 Bennett, J. (2009). "Procreation of the Wicked". In: Mudrian, A. (ed.), Precious Metal: Decibel Presents the Stories Behind 25 Extreme Metal Masterpieces (pp. 31–47). Cambridge, MA: Da Capo Press.
 Fischer, T. G. (2000). Are You Morbid? Into the Pandemonium of Celtic Frost. London: Sanctuary Publishing Limited.
 Gregori, D. (2003). "Thrash Metal or, How I Learned to Stop Worrying and Love the Bomb". Terrorizer 108: 10-14.
 Hellhammer (1990). Apocalyptic Raids 1990 A.D. [CD]. New York, NY: Futurist/Noise International.

External links 

 Official Hellhammer Burial Site
 
 

Swiss heavy metal musical groups
Swiss black metal musical groups
Swiss death metal musical groups
Swiss musical trios
Musical groups established in 1982
Musical groups disestablished in 1984
Century Media Records artists
1982 establishments in Switzerland
1984 disestablishments in Switzerland
Noise Records artists